Raymond Garfield Sheppard (born May 27, 1966) is a Canadian former professional ice hockey right winger who played in the National Hockey League (NHL) from 1987 to 2000. Sheppard was born in Pembroke, Ontario, but grew up in Petawawa, Ontario.

Playing career
Sheppard was selected 60th overall by the Buffalo Sabres in the 1984 NHL Entry Draft. He played 817 career NHL games, scoring 357 goals and 300 assists for 657 points. His best season statistically was the 1993–94 season when he scored 52 goals and 93 points for the Detroit Red Wings. He also played for the New York Rangers, San Jose Sharks, Florida Panthers, and the Carolina Hurricanes. On March 21, 1996, Sheppard scored the first home ice hat trick in Panthers franchise history.

He achieved a rare feat during his career, scoring at least twenty goals in a season for six different NHL teams (accomplishing it in 1999). This was a record of until Bill Guerin passed him by scoring twenty goals with seven teams.

Sheppard has been named the second-best golfer amongst athletes (of sports other than golf) by Golf Digest. He currently serves on the board of directors for the Panthers Alumni Association.

Career statistics

Awards and honours

Transactions
 Drafted by the Buffalo Sabres in the 1984 NHL Entry Draft in the third round as the 60th overall pick.
Acquired by the New York Rangers for $1 USD from the Buffalo Sabres in 1990.
 August 5, 1991 - Signed as an unrestricted free agent with the Detroit Red Wings.
 October 24, 1995 - Traded by the Detroit Red Wings to the San Jose Sharks for Igor Larionov and a conditional 1998 draft pick.
 March 16, 1996 - Traded by the San Jose Sharks, along with a fourth round pick in 1996, to the Florida Panthers for 2nd and fourth round picks in 1996.
 March 24, 1998 - Traded at the deadline by the Florida Panthers to the Carolina Hurricanes for Kirk McLean.
 November 15, 1999 - Signed as an unrestricted free agent with the Florida Panthers.
 Announced retirement at the end of 1999–2000 NHL season.

References

External links

1966 births
Living people
Buffalo Sabres draft picks
Buffalo Sabres players
Canadian ice hockey right wingers
Canadian people of English descent
Carolina Hurricanes players
Cornwall Royals (OHL) players
Detroit Red Wings players
Florida Panthers players
Ice hockey people from Ontario
New York Rangers players
Sportspeople from Pembroke, Ontario
Rochester Americans players
San Jose Sharks players
SC Langnau players
Canadian expatriate ice hockey players in Switzerland